Cumming may refer to:

Places in the United States 
 Cumming, Georgia
 Cumming, Iowa
 Cumming Township, Michigan

Other uses
 Ejaculation
 Cumming (surname)
 Cumming baronets, a title in the Baronetage of Nova Scotia, Canada
 Cumming Corporation, an American project management firm
 Cumming School of Medicine, Calgary, Alberta, Canada
 Cumming metro station, Santiago, Chile
 Clan Cumming, a Scottish clan from the central Highlands

See also 
 Cuming (disambiguation)
 Cummings (disambiguation)
 Cummins (disambiguation)